Cecil Lee Pickett (born January 19, 1970) is a former Major League Baseball left-handed pitcher.

Drafted by the Cincinnati Reds in the 28th round of the 1992 MLB amateur draft, Pickett made his Major League Baseball debut with the Arizona Diamondbacks on April 28, 1998, and appeared in his final game on May 5, 1998.

Pickett was a member of the inaugural Arizona Diamondbacks team that began play in Major League Baseball in 1998.

Sources

1970 births
Living people
Arizona Diamondbacks players
Baseball players from Fort Worth, Texas
Major League Baseball pitchers
Northeastern Oklahoma A&M Golden Norsemen baseball players
Vernon Chaps baseball players
Billings Mustangs players
Charleston Wheelers players
Chattanooga Lookouts players
Fresno Grizzlies players
Oklahoma RedHawks players
Phoenix Firebirds players
Shreveport Captains players
Tucson Sidewinders players
Winston-Salem Spirits players